The Peninsula Clarion is a regional newspaper published in Kenai, Alaska that serves the population of the Kenai Peninsula. They also publish the Peninsula Clarion Dispatch which is a free weekly circular released each Wednesday with local human interest stories and advertisements. The paper was founded in 1970, and was purchased in 1990 by Georgia-based Morris Communications. In 2017, Morris sold its newspapers to GateHouse Media. In 2018, GateHouse sold its Alaska papers to Sound Publications.

See also
 List of newspapers in Alaska

References

External links
 

1970 establishments in Alaska
Daily newspapers published in the United States
Kenai Peninsula Borough, Alaska
Newspapers published in Alaska
Publications established in 1970